Sam Cooke at the Copa is a live album by American singer-songwriter Sam Cooke. The album was released in 1964 in the United States by RCA Victor. It was Cooke's only live album to be released during his lifetime; Live at the Harlem Square Club, 1963, although recorded earlier, was not released until 1985. Copa was reissued in 2003, with remastered sound.

The album peaked at No. 29 on the Billboard 200.

Production
The album was recorded during a two-week stand in July 1964. The shows during the 1964 engagement were well received, in contrast to a show Cooke performed at the Copa in 1958. Staying away from the Copa—and from many "white" clubs—for years, Cooke was inspired to return after watching Nat King Cole go over well there. Cooke chose to perform a set heavier on standards and show tunes.

Sam Cooke at the Copa was produced by Al Schmitt. It was recorded on 3 tracks, and was engineered by Bernard Keville.

Critical reception
AllMusic wrote: "One of a handful of live albums by a major soul artist of its era, it captured Cooke in excellent voice, and was well-recorded -- it just wasn't really a 'soul' album, except perhaps in the tamest possible definition of that term." The New Rolling Stone Album Guide called the album "genial, and even a bit cheesy in a jivey, Vegas kind of way, but nonetheless spirited in its own right." The Chicago Tribune wrote that Cooke's "fluttering yodel and charming demeanor make evident that he knew he had crashed through the invisible ceiling, hurdling the only barrier he hadn't yet cleared and solidifying his status as the ultimate crossover artist." 

The Times wrote that the album "captures the more decorous version of the singer’s live act." Praising the sound of the 2003 reissue, The Baltimore Sun wrote that Cooke "still manages to imbue such stuffy standards as 'Frankie and Johnny', 'If I Had a Hammer' and 'Tennessee Waltz' with gospel-dipped exuberance."

Track listing

Side one
 "Opening Introduction" – 0:35
 "The Best Things in Life Are Free" (Lew Brown, Buddy DeSylva, Ray Henderson) – 1:31
 "Bill Bailey Won't You Please Come Home" (Hughie Cannon) – 2:50
 "Nobody Knows You When You're Down and Out" (James Cox) – 3:18
 "Frankie and Johnny" (Cooke) – 3:00
 Medley: "Try a Little Tenderness" / "(I Love You) For Sentimental Reasons" / "You Send Me" (William Best / Sam Cooke / Deek Watson) – 4:55
 "If I Had a Hammer" (Lee Hays, Pete Seeger) – 6:25

Side two
 "When I Fall in Love" (Edward Heyman, Victor Young) – 3:05
 "Twistin' the Night Away" (Cooke) – 5:04
 "This Little Light of Mine" (Cooke) – 3:36
 "Blowin' in the Wind" (Bob Dylan) – 3:01
 "Tennessee Waltz" (Pee Wee King, Redd Stewart) – 3:36

Personnel
All credits adapted from the album's remastered liner notes.

Sam Cooke's Band
Sam Cooke – vocals
Harper Cosby – bass guitar
Sticks Evans – percussion
June Gardner – drums
Clifton White – guitar
Bobby "Valentino" Womack – guitar

Joe Mele's Copacabana Band
Joe Mele – leader
Joseph Fogila – saxophone, flute
John Altman – saxophone, clarinet, flute
George Barrow – saxophone, clarinet
Anthony Ferina – saxophone, clarinet

Richard Kamuca – saxophone, clarinet
William Smith – saxophone, clarinet
Alfred Cobbs – trombone
Virgil Davis – trombone
Ronald Plumby – trombone
Richard Harris – trombone
Bart Varsalona – trombone
Clyde Reasinger – trumpet
George Triffon – trumpet
Louis Mauro – bass guitar
Eugene Padden – bass guitar
Production
Bernard Keville – engineer
Al Schmitt – record producer

See also
List of number-one R&B albums of 1965 (U.S.)

References

Sam Cooke live albums
1964 live albums
RCA Records live albums